Gaetano Pusterla (born 20 October 1947) is a former Italian male long-distance runner who competed at 2 editions of the IAAF World Cross Country Championships (1971 and 1973).

References

External links
 Gaetano Pusterla profile at Association of Road Racing Statisticians

1947 births
Living people
Italian male long-distance runners